The 2001–02 season was Colchester United's 60th season in their history and their fourth successive season in the third tier of English football, the Second Division. Alongside competing in the Second Division, the club also participated in the FA Cup, the League Cup and the Football League Trophy.

Steve Whitton led the U's to a 15th placed league finish. They were knocked out of the FA Cup by York City in the first round. In the League Cup, Colchester defeated First Division Portsmouth at Fratton Park, before falling to defeat to Barnsley in the second round. They also reached the second round of the Football League Trophy, beating Swindon Town in the first round but they were eliminated by Reading in the second round.

Season overview
Colchester leapt to the top of the Second Division table by the end of August, having beaten Chesterfield 6–3 in the opening game of the season, and also knocked out First Division Portsmouth out of the League Cup at Fratton Park. However, they failed to capitalise on this despite manager Steve Whitton equalling the club's record transfer fee of £50,000 for Northern Ireland international Adrian Coote from Norwich City. They finished 15th, a steady year-on-year improvement after recording 18th and then 17th-place finishes in the previous campaigns respectively.

After beating Portsmouth in the first round of the League Cup, Barnsley proved too much for the U's in the second round. York City eliminated Colchester from the FA Cup in the first round, and Reading defeated the U's in the second round of the Football League Trophy following a first round win over Swindon Town.

Players

Transfers

In

 Total spending:  ~ £50,000

Out

 Total incoming:  ~ £0

Loans in

Loans out

Match details

Second Division

League table

Results round by round

Matches

Football League Cup

Football League Trophy

FA Cup

Squad statistics

Appearances and goals

|-
!colspan="16"|Players who appeared for Colchester who left during the season

|}

Goalscorers

Disciplinary record

Clean sheets
Number of games goalkeepers kept a clean sheet.

Player debuts
Players making their first-team Colchester United debut in a fully competitive match.

See also
List of Colchester United F.C. seasons

References

General
Books

Websites

Specific

2001-02
English football clubs 2001–02 season
2001–02 Football League Second Division by team